Spartak Kyiv is a Ukrainian women's handball club from Kyiv. It used to be a member of the Spartak VSS during the Soviet era.

History
Spartak was arguably the best team in Europe between the 1970s and the late-1980s, with a record 13 European Cups in addition to twenty Soviet Championships in a row. The 1989 final lost to emerging Austrian powerhouse Hypo Niederösterreich marked Spartak's last appearance in the competition.

Following the collapse of the Soviet Union the team declined. It has since won three Ukrainian championships, most recently in 2000. However, in 2003 it enjoyed a last European success reaching the Cup Winner's Cup's final. In recent seasons it has appeared in the Challenge Cup.

Titles
 European Cup
 1970, 1971, 1972, 1973, 1975, 1977, 1979, 1981, 1983, 1985, 1986, 1987, 1988
 Soviet Championship
 1969, 1970, 1971, 1972, 1973, 1974, 1975, 1976, 1977, 1978, 1979, 1980, 1981, 1982, 1983, 1984, 1985, 1986, 1987, 1988
 Ukrainian Super League
 1992, 1996, 2000

References

Sport in Kyiv
Ukrainian handball clubs
Handball clubs established in 1962
1962 establishments in Ukraine